The Sportsman's Battalions, also known as the 23rd (Service) Battalion and 24th (Service) Battalion (2nd Sportsman's), Royal Fusiliers (City of London Regiment) were among the Pals battalions formed by the British Army in the early stages of the First World War (1914–1918). Rather than be taken from a small geographical area, these particular battalions were largely made up of men who had made their name in sports such as cricket, golf, boxing and football or the media. It was intended for upper and middle class men, physically fit, able to shoot and ride, up to the age of 45.

The first battalion, which accepted men up to the age of 45, was formed at the Hotel Cecil in The Strand in early September 1914 by Mrs E. Cunliffe-Owen after she gained permission from Lord Kitchener. From November 1914 until June 1915, training took place at a purpose-built camp at Grey Towers in Hornchurch, Essex. In June 1915 the battalion was attached to 99th Brigade, 33rd Division, and landed at Boulogne in November 1915 and on 25 November transferred with the 99th Brigade to the 2nd Division. The battalion saw action on the Western Front at Vimy Ridge, the Somme and the battle for Delville Wood. It included several first class cricketers, the lightweight boxing champion of England, an ex-mayor of Exeter, and the author John Chesshire. Taking Surrey County Cricket Club as an example, Ernie Hayes, Bill Hitch and Andy Sandham joined the battalion.

The 24th (Service) Battalion (2nd Sportsman's) was raised in London on 20 November 1914 by Mrs Cunliffe-Owen, became attached to 99th Brigade, 33rd Division in June 1915 and transferred to 5th Brigade in 2nd Division in December 1915. Famous recruits included the millionaire politician Sir Herbert Raphael and cricketer C. P. McGahey. Training took place at Hare Hall near Romford. Amongst those recruited was Frederic Thomas Horne, the Liberal Agent for West Gloucestershire, who fell at the Somme on 5 September 1916.

A third Sportsman's Battalion, the 30th (Reserve) Battalion, Royal Fusiliers, was formed in July 1915 from remaining depot companies of the First and Second battalions. During 1915 its headquarters were in Hornchurch, Leamington Spa, Oxford, and finally at the Fort in Leith.

Soldiers

Footballers

References

 Hard as Nails: The Sportsmen's Battalion of World War One: The Sportsman's Battalion of World War I by Michael Foley

Kitchener's Army
Pals battalions
Royal Fusiliers